Line of Descent (previously known as The Field) is a 2019 Indian crime drama film written and directed by debutant Rohit Karn Batra and starring Ronit Roy, Neeraj Kabi, and Ali Haji as the three brothers of a mafia patriarch who fight over the future of their crime family and Brendan Fraser, an undercover cop who brings them to their downfall, while Prem Chopra, and Abhay Deol play supporting roles. The film was released on 4 December 2019. It had a simultaneous release in theaters and video on demand in United States while in India it was released on ZEE5.

Plot

In Delhi, India, a mafia family consisting of Prithvi (Roy), Bharat (Chopra), Siddharth "Sidd" (Kabi), Suraj (Haji), and Sujhata (Priyanka) are at a birthday party celebrating the newest addition, Nya, to their family. The youngest brother, Suraj doesn't want anything to do with his family and wants to live a normal live out of crime. He introduces his mother to his girlfriend, Seema (Victor).

After the party, Prithvi heads to see Sidd beating up a young man which he stops just in time. In reality, a family are signing their home to the Sinha Mafia and are being forced to leave their home by the crime boss, Bharat. At the party, Suraj and Seema are enjoying one another until a boy and his gang stalk them and try to abuse Suraj's girlfriend, & one of the boy punches Suraj. Suraj comes home beaten up & Prithvi comes to his aide. Suraj declines to tell Prithvi because he does not want it to be resolved with violence.

On the other side of town, an officer of the law, Raghav (Deol) moves in with his wife. At his headquarters, Bharat says that it has been 3 years since the business started to go down. Since the mafia family is declining, a new leader will have to rise and become the new crime boss and he decides that Prithvi must be the new leader because Bharat can no longer run anymore from the police.

Prithvi goes and sees a homeowner who doesn't want anything to do with the Sinha Mafia family and Suraj draws his gun and holds it nervously as Prithvi orders him to. Suraj accidentally shoots the homeowner in the shoulder and takes him to the hospital. At home, Prithvi argues when Suraj will be able to be in the mafia family by doing his job right. Sidd believes he won't be able to do such a thing and calls him not being his brother, until Bharat calls him out that Suraj can do a lot more than Sidd can and orders him out. This creates tension with the family.

The next morning, Bharat grabs a gun and commits suicide after being ridden with grief. The whole mafia family is heard of the news of Bharat's death: Sidd arrives and sees his father lying on the floor. Suraj blames himself for the death of his father, while Seema tells him that it is not his fault. The family attend Bharat's funeral. 

After the death of his father, Prithvi decides to end up the crimes, and focus on the electronics store, but Sidd disagrees and starts his plan to drive the mafia back into business. Sidd tries to persuade into doing arms trade with Prithvi but to no avail. A robbery happens at Sinha Electronics and Prithvi & Sidd go to investigate, however, this is all revealed to be a set up as Sidd supposedly kills Prithvi. At the hospital, Prithvi survives, Raghav meets with Sidd and Suraj. Raghav questions Sidd about his motives, he lies and then leaves. At a workshop, an undercover officer who is part of the trap, Charu (Fraser) meets up with Sidd about the arms trade smuggle. Sidd then hires a sniper to kill Suraj but kills Seema instead. At the hospital, Seema's father blames Suraj for the death of his daughter. He then goes to the club to chill until he meets Charu. Suraj does not want to do anything with his family so he tries to leave but Charu tells him he can help him getting out to which Suraj thinks about.

At a disclose location, Officer Raghav meets with Daniel Bates, Deputy Commissioner of U.K. Interpol. They discuss how Bharat Sinha was involved with real estate pirating and the start of the history of the crime family. In the late 1940s, Bharat's first wife was pregnant with his first child, Prithvi in honor of his twin brother. He was a hard worker, and the brothers were both successful with their restaurant, however, one day a tragic accident occurred with Prithvi, Bharat's twin brother with life-threatening injuries. The only way for him to survive was from a surgery. However, Bharat could not pay the hospital bill since it was expensive, and he sold the restaurant in order for his brother to survive. He waited for a long time for the money from the restaurant to come and pay for his brother's injuries, but it never came. As a result, Prithvi died in Bharat's eyes. 

In a fit of rage, Bharat stabbed his eldest brother and that got him his money back. However, there was still a hole in his heart. Until he met a British gangster, Morris Burns, Bharat sold everything and made a crime partnership. This is how he slowly grew to a rise. Bharat's wife lit herself on fire unable to bear with how Bharat had become a monster. He then met his second wife, Neema Aziz who became Neha Sinha, & many of the operations disappeared after the birth of Suraj. Local thuggery intensified, after the two sons gained more control. The plan is set for a trap for the Mafia family with Officer Raghav leading it.

Sidd kills Prithvi when he goes to the shop to close the store for the day. He hides the body in the middle of nowhere and burns it. A witness notices him burning something and Sidd kills him too. The next day, Suraj visits Charu and tells him he needs his help, and he agrees. At the workshop, Sidd tells Charu that he will take care of Suraj. Sidd closes the electronics store and at another store, Suraj chats with Officer Raghav about the trap. At the night of the trap, Charu goes to Suraj and tells him that if he does this right, and he does not have to do it again. Suraj goes into the restaurant to get Sidd's confession. Suraj tries to get the confession but the plan backfires. While looking for Sidd, he gets the guns of two of Sidd's men and tries to get the other gun, but when Sidd comes in at the other bathroom, Suraj kills two men along with injuring Sidd.

A few days after the event, Raghav is living peacefully, and visits Suraj at a jail. Raghav tells Suraj that his mother left India and went to the U.A.E. Raghav tells Suraj that he helped him with ending the mafia family in Delhi along with Charu. He then tells Suraj that he will talk to a lawyer so that way his sentence can be lowered. He tells him that his brother, Sidd was having an affair, and that the discovery of Pritvi's body was found with the family of the witness living nearby. He also tells him that Sidd hired a sniper to kill Seema, and that he got him to confess. 

It is revealed that Prithvi paid off Charu to protect Suraj from Sidd. Prithvi also set up the meeting between Charu and Suraj. After Prithvi was killed, Charu knew Sidd was out of control and set up the trap between Sidd and Suraj. Officer Raghav also tells Suraj that Nya's father is not Siddharth's, but Prithvi's. Suraj's sister-in law suffered a mental breakdown because of it and sent her off to a psychiatric hospital. Nya is currently with her sister. The film ends as Raghav tells Suraj of a request to get Nya in his family as he and his wife are not able to conceive, and Suraj happily accepts.

Cast

 Ronit Roy as Prithvi Sinha, the leader of his mafia family
 Brendan Fraser as Charlie 'Charu' Jolpin, an undercover cop brings the mafia family toward their downfall
 Abhay Deol as Officer Raghav, an officer who wants to bring the Sinha mafia family down
 Ali Haji as Suraj Sinha, Prithvi's youngest brother 
 Neeraj Kabi as Siddharth Sinha, Prithvi's middle brother, who secretly wants to get rid of Prithvi and his family
 Prem Chopra as Bharat Sinha, the father of Prithvi and Siddharth
 Gopal Datt as Arun, an undercover cop working with Charu
 Shiben Mohanty as young Bharat Sinha
 Anisha Angelina Victor as Seema, Suraj's girlfriend
 Jagen Mohanty as young Prithvi
 Charlotte Poutrel as Racheal, Siddharth's girlfriend and accomplice
 Harshad Kumar as an Undercover Officer
 Dev Bhagtani as a spoiled brat

Production
Though set in India, Batra said Line of Descent should be seen as an international film, explaining that though he could have set the story in a typical American city, he chose to film in the country "because the visual energy of India is very different, so I thought why not use that." He also states that "Filmmaking sometimes ends up being very local for the country a film is made for, but at the same time we are in a very global world, so I think films should reflect this more ... That's why Brendan's character is so interesting in that he grew up in the U.S. and is then in India."

Filming
Pre-production started on 18 April 2016 and filming began on 18 June 2016. Brendan Fraser was in Mumbai for two weeks in May to film his scenes, which feature dialogue in Hindi and English. Speaking of Fraser's time filming in India, Batra said: "It was fantastic. He had a lot of respect for the actors. For instance, Neeraj Kabi was in Talvar [based on a real-life murder mystery that premiered at Toronto] and Fraser actually happened to see that movie on the flight to Mumbai."

References

External links
 
 

English-language Indian films
2010s Hindi-language films
Indian multilingual films
2019 multilingual films
Films set in Delhi
ZEE5 original films
Films scored by Mario Grigorov